Sergio Chiamparino (born 1 September 1948) is an Italian politician.
He was President of Piedmont from 2014 to 2019, and was the mayor of Turin, Italy from 2001 to 2011.

A graduate in political sciences at the University of Turin, where he worked as a researcher until 1975, Chiamparino started his political career that same year as head of the Italian Communist Party in the Town Council of Moncalieri, his native city. He joined the Democratic Party of the Left on its formation and was elected to the Chamber of Deputies in 1996, following a surprise defeat in 1994 to the centre-right candidate Alessandro Meluzzi (a former Freemason who laterly become an Orthodox bishop) in the left-leaning district of Mirafiori.

He was elected mayor of Turin in 2001, succeeding to Valentino Castellani and then re-elected in May 2006 with 66.6% of votes, defeating the centre-right candidate Rocco Buttiglione. He was afterward elected president of the Piedmont regional council in 2014.

References

|-

1948 births
Candidates for President of Italy
Living people
Mayors of Turin
Presidents of Piedmont
People from Moncalieri
University of Turin alumni
Members of the Regional Council of Piedmont
Deputies of Legislature XIII of Italy
Italian Communist Party politicians
Democratic Party of the Left politicians
Democrats of the Left politicians
Democratic Party (Italy) politicians
20th-century Italian politicians
21st-century Italian politicians
Grand Officers of the Order of Merit of the Italian Republic
Alpini
Turin communal councillors

Italian Freemasons